Euonymus occidentalis is a species of spindle tree known by the common names western burning bush and western wahoo.

Distribution
It is native to western North America from British Columbia to California, where it is the only member of its genus growing wild.

Description
This is a shrub or small tree reaching maximum heights of anywhere from two to six meters. The thin, green, oval-shaped leaves are three to fourteen centimeters long and sometimes rolled under along the edges. The inflorescence holds up to five small flowers at the end of a long peduncle. Each flower has five rounded pink to brown and white mottled petals around a central nectar disc with 5 nubs. The fruit is a rounded capsule with three bulging lobes. It opens to reveal one seed in each of the three lobes. The seed in concealed in a red aril.

External links
Jepson Manual Treatment
Photo gallery

occidentalis
Flora of British Columbia
Flora without expected TNC conservation status